is a drama manga by manga author . The manga was serialized in Japan by Kodansha in the monthly seinen magazine Afternoon from October 2004 to 2005, and the 11 chapters were collected into a single bound volume. A French translation was published by Kana in its collection Made in in 2008.

The story is set in the contemporary Japan, and follows the manager of a public bath Kanae whose husband vanished while traveling. The French edition of the manga was widely reviewed, being praised for its dreamlike qualities and calm pace, the richness of its emotions, and its characterization.

Manga

Kodansha published the single tankōbon volume on 22 November 2005 in Japan.  Kana published the French edition of this manga on 19 September 2008.

Reception

In France this manga was an official selection of the 2009 Angoulême International Comics Festival, and won the Prix Asie-ACBD 2009. It was named as top manga pick for year 2008 by the Belgian newspaper Le Soir.

References

External links
 Kodansha official website 
 
 Manga News.com review 
 Anime Land review 
 Le Soir.be review 
 Bodoï review 
 Bd Gest' review 
 Manga Sanctuary 
 Planete Bd review 

Drama anime and manga
Kodansha manga
Seinen manga
Slice of life anime and manga